Right Back Where We Started From is the debut album by British R&B and soul music singer Maxine Nightingale recorded and released in 1976 by United Artists.

Background and recording
The title track was released as a single in the summer of 1975 reaching #8 in the UK: subsequent to its year-end US release the track would reach #5 in Adult Contemporary, #9 in Dance Music/Club Play, #46 in R&B singles and #2 on the Billboard Hot 100. Nightingale, spending time with her husband in Japan at the time her single gained popularity, ignored advisements from United Artists that she return to London to cut an album, accepting that advice only as the single moved up the upper half of the  Billboard Hot 100 in March 1976.

The initial recording of the "Right Back Where We Started From" single had been in a session at Central Sound a small demo studio on Denmark Street in Camden: the basic track had then been augmented at London studios Olympic Sound, Morgan Studios, and Basing Street Studios. The tracks to complete the Right Back Where We Started From album were recorded at Eden Studios in Chiswick. (Maxine Nightingale quote:)"The ...album had to be completed in two weeks - - they wanted to rush release it in America. I chose all the songs but I would have made a few production changes had I been there all the time."

Critical reception
Released in June 1976 - concurrent with the single "Gotta Be the One" - , the Right Back Where We Started From album drew little evident critical notice. Dave Marsh of Rolling Stone in his syndicated capsule review column, while praising the title cut as "one of the most engaging singles of the current Top 40", opined that the album overall "fumbles through mild, unexciting ballads (a little like those Natalie Cole does so well) and the [expected] listless disco forays. Lynn Short of the Morristown Daily Record agreed: "'Right Back Where We Started From' is definitely a cut above the average Top 40 song. Unfortunately it's also a cut above...the rest of the album [which consists of] uninspired upbeat tunes ('I Think I Wanna Possess You') and semi-ballads which range from not bad ('Reasons') to definitely bad ('Life Has Just Begun'). It's fairly clear this is an album that was quickly assembled to cash in on a hit single."

The single "Gotta Be the One" would prove to be a Top 40 shortfall peaking at #53 on the Billboard Hot 100 (and faring less well in the other US music trade magazines: the Cashbox singles chart afforded "Gotta Be the One" a #84 peak while the track failed to reach the top 100 Singles Chart in Record World peaking at #102 on the Singles Chart 101–150. Another album track: "(I Think I Wanna) Possess You", had an unsuccessful single release in September 1976. Without the momentum of a current major hit single, the Right Back Where We Started From album rose no higher than #65 on the Billboard album charts. Nightingale herself would later state (in 1979) that the Right Back Where We Started From album (Maxine Nightingale quote:)"came out too long after the [title] single and [therefore] was unsuccessful."

Track listing

Side 1
"(I Think I Wanna) Possess You" (Tim Moore) – 3:29
"Bless You" (John Lennon) – 4:30
"Right Back Where We Started From" (Pierre Tubbs, Vince Edwards) – 3:11
"In Love We Grow" (Dennis Belfield)  – 3:35 (Timed @ 2:39 on LP)
"Gotta Be the One" (Pierre Tubbs) – 2:50
"One Last Ride" (Pierre Tubbs) – 2:33
"Reasons" (Maurice White, Charles Stepney, Philip Bailey) – 4:23

Side 2
"If I Ever Lose This Heaven" (Leon Ware, Pam Sawyer) – 3:59
"Love Enough" (Tim Moore) – 3:35
"You Got the Love" (Chaka Khan, Ray Parker Jr.)  – 4:35
"Life Has Just Begun" (Glenn Nightingale) – 3:38
"Everytime I See a Butterfly" (Tiny Barge)  – 3:37
"Good-Bye Again" (Pierre Tubbs, Vince Edwards) – 3:27

Charts

Personnel

Mick Barker - Guitars
Glenn Nightingale - Guitars, Cabasa
Pierre Tubbs - Guitars, Elka Synthesizer, Percussion, Retzina, Vocals
Mike de Albuquerque - Bass
Theo Thunder - Drums
Pete Kershaw - Drums
Bob Andrews - Clavinet, Piano, Roland Synthesizer, Fender Rhodes, Percussion, Vocals
Lynton Naiff - Piano, Fender Rhodes, Clavinet, Marimba, Mellotron                                                                                                                                                       
Dave Ulm - Percussion, Congas, Bongos, Tambourine
Raphael Ravenscroft, Bill Skeat - brass arrangements
Tony Rivers, John Perry, Ken Gold, Vince Edwards, Al Matthews, Pete Kershaw, Pierre Tubbs, Maxine Nightingale, Liza Strike, Helen Chappell - backing vocals
Frank Ricotti - Vibraphone
Gerry Shury, Wilf Gibson - strings Arrangements, Conducted
Wilf Gibson- Violin
Peter Hughes - Baritone Saxophone
Vince Edwards: Percussion, Vocals
Raphael “Earl” Ravenscroft - Baritone Saxophone, Flute Saxophone
Ronji Southern - Percussion, Vocals
Kenny Wheeler - Flugelhorn, Trumpet
Bernado Ball -  timbales
Ian Harrison - Percussion
Jeff Seopardie - Drums                                                                                                                                           
Tony Wolbrom - Piranas

Production

Produced by: Pierre Tubbs
Recorded and Mixed at: Eden Studios (except side 1, track 3), Chiswick, London & Central Sound, Olympic Sound, Morgan Studios, Island Studios (side 1, track 3)
Engineers: Mike Gardner assisted by Roger Bechirian
Rhythm Tracks disorganised by Lynton Naiff
Album cover concept: Pierre Tubbs, Derek Richards
Album art direction: Dave Murphy
Album photography: Derek Richards
Album design: Bob Searles

References

1976 albums
Maxine Nightingale albums
United Artists Records albums
Albums recorded at Morgan Sound Studios